The Volvo Albatross was a golf tournament on the Swedish Golf Tour 1985–1989. It was played near Gothenburg, Sweden.

Winners

References

Swedish Golf Tour events
Golf tournaments in Sweden